Gmina Sanniki is a rural gmina (administrative district) in Gostynin County, Masovian Voivodeship, in east-central Poland.

Villages
Gmina Sanniki contains the villages and settlements of Aleksandrów, Brzezia, Brzeziny, Czyżew, Działy, Krubin, Lasek, Lubików, Lwówek, Mocarzewo, Nowy Barcik, Osmolin, Osmólsk Górny, Sanniki, Sielce, Staropol, Stary Barcik, Szkarada, Wólka Niska and Wólka Wysoka.

Neighbouring gminas
Gmina Sanniki is bordered by the gminas of Gąbin, Iłów, Kiernozia, Pacyna and Słubice.

References
Polish official population figures 2006

External links 

Sanniki
Gostynin County